Gary Living (born 1 October 1952) is an Australian former cricketer. He played four first-class cricket matches for Victoria between 1972 and 1973.

See also
 List of Victoria first-class cricketers

References

External links
 

1952 births
Living people
Australian cricketers
Victoria cricketers
Cricketers from Melbourne